Stefanie Guillen Evangelista (born 1989) is a beauty pageant titleholder who was crowned Miss Aruba 2013 and was represented her Aruba at the Miss Universe 2013 pageant.

Early life
Evangelista finished her Bachelor's degree in Marketing and Communication. She is working as a Sales Representative for a designer brand boutique. Stefanie's ambition is to continue her career in the fashion industry.

Miss Aruba 2013
Evangelista was crowned Miss Aruba 2013 at the Grand Ballroom of the Westin Aruba in Palm Beach on 19 July. She represented Aruba in Miss Universe 2013 in Moscow, Russia on 9 November.

References

External links
 Miss Aruba Beauty Pageant event for 2013

Aruban beauty pageant winners
Aruban female models
Living people
Miss Universe 2013 contestants
1987 births